Ficus destruens is a hemiepiphytic fig that is endemic to the wet tropical rainforests of northeastern Queensland, Australia.

Description
It begins life as a hemiepiphyte.

References

External links

Trees of Australia
Flora of Queensland
destruens
Rosales of Australia
Epiphytes
Taxa named by Ferdinand von Mueller